Robert "Robbie" Hunter (born 22 April 1977) is a retired South African professional road racing cyclist who competed professionally between 1999 and 2013. Hunter competed with UCI ProTeam  during his final professional season.

Career

Hunter became the first South African to compete in the Tour de France, when he did so in 2001. His achievements include winning stages at the 1999 and 2001 Vuelta a Españas, the 2007 Tour de France, and the overall title at the 2004 Tour of Qatar, as well as the points classification at the 2004 Tour de Suisse.

Hunter  won sprint stage 11, the first stage won by a South African.

Following the 2013 season, Hunter retired from professional cycling. In November 2015 he announced that he was leaving the team in order to spend more time with his family and concentrate on his role as a rider agent for a number of African cyclists, including Louis Meintjes.

Hunter worked as the video assistant commissaire at the 2018 Tour de France.

Personal life
Hunter resides in Arth, Schwyz, Switzerland.

Career achievements

Major results
Sources:

1999
 Vuelta a España
1st  Sprints classification
1st Stage 1
2000
 1st  Time trial, National Road Championships
 2nd Overall Ronde van Nederland
1st  Points classification
1st  Young rider classification
1st Stages 2 & 3
 2nd EnBW Grand Prix (with Oscar Camenzind)
 3rd Overall Four Days of Dunkirk
 3rd Memorial Rik Van Steenbergen
2001
 1st Tour de Rijke
 1st Stage 17 Vuelta a España
 9th Overall Ronde van Nederland
1st  Young rider classification
2002
 1st Stage 1 Tour de Pologne
 2nd Overall Tour de Langkawi
1st  Points classification
1st Stages 1 (ITT), 2 & 5
 2nd Grote Prijs Jef Scherens
 5th Overall Three Days of De Panne
 6th Gent–Wevelgem
 7th Road race, Commonwealth Games
2003
 4th Tour de Picardie
 10th Trofeo Cala Millor
2004
 1st  Overall Tour of Qatar
1st Stages 3 & 5
 Tour de Suisse
1st Stages 3 & 5
 Uniqa Classic
1st  Points classification   
1st Stages 1 & 3 
 1st Stage 4b Sachsen-Tour
 5th International Grand Prix Doha
2005
 1st International Grand Prix Doha
 1st Stage 1 (TTT) Volta a Catalunya
 1st Stage 1 Tour de Georgia
 1st Stage 4 Setmana Catalana
 1st Stage 5 Tour Méditerranéen
 8th Trofeo Luis Puig
2006
 African Road Championships
1st  Time trial
3rd  Road race
 4th Overall Tour of Qatar
2007
 1st  Overall Volta ao Distrito de Santarém
1st Stage 2
 1st  Overall Tour de Picardie
1st Stage 1
 1st Stage 11 Tour de France
 1st Stage 2 Clasica Alcobendas
 1st Stage 5 Giro del Capo
 3rd Coppa Bernocchi
 4th Gran Premio della Costa Etruschi
 10th Milan–San Remo
 10th Grand Prix Pino Cerami
2008
 1st Stage 4 GP CTT Correios de Portugal
 1st Cape Argus Cycle Tour
 4th Memorial Viviana Manservisi
 8th Overall Giro della Provincia di Grosseto
2009
 1st Stage 3 Giro del Trentino
 1st Stage 4 Tour Méditerranéen
 3rd Gran Premio della Costa Etruschi
 9th Overall Delta Tour Zeeland
2010
 Vuelta a Murcia
1st Stages 1 & 2 
 9th Overall Tour Down Under
2011
 1st Mumbai Cyclothon II
 1st Stage 1 Tour of Austria
 4th Mumbai Cyclothon I
 7th Grand Prix de Denain
2012
 National Road Championships
1st  Road race
4th Time trial
 1st Stage 4 (TTT) Giro d'Italia
 1st Stage 2 (TTT) Tour of Qatar
2013
 1st  Overall Mzansi Tour
1st  Points classification 
1st Stage 2
 8th Trofeo Platja de Muro

Grand Tour general classification results timeline

References

External links

Cycling Base: Robert Hunter

1977 births
Living people
South African male cyclists
South African Tour de France stage winners
Olympic cyclists of South Africa
Cyclists at the 2000 Summer Olympics
Cyclists at the 2004 Summer Olympics
Cyclists at the 2008 Summer Olympics
Cyclists at the 2006 Commonwealth Games
Cyclists from Johannesburg
White South African people
South African people of English descent
South African Vuelta a España stage winners
Tour de Suisse stage winners
Commonwealth Games competitors for South Africa